This Is Your Life is an American reality documentary series broadcast on NBC radio from 1948 to 1952, and on NBC television from 1952 to 1961. It was originally hosted by its creator and producer Ralph Edwards. In the program, the host surprised guests and then took them through a retrospective of their lives in front of an audience, including appearances by colleagues, friends, and family. Edwards revived the show in 1971–1972, and Joseph Campanella hosted a version in 1983. Edwards returned for various specials in the late 1980s.

Concept
The idea for This Is Your Life arose while Edwards was working on game show Truth or Consequences. He had been asked by the United States Army to "do something" for paraplegic soldiers at Birmingham General Army Hospital, a California Army rehabilitation hospital in Van Nuys, Los Angeles (a site later converted into a high school).  Edwards chose a "particularly despondent young soldier and hit on the idea of presenting his life on the air, in order to integrate the wreckage of the present with his happier past and the promise of a hopeful future."  Edwards received such positive public feedback from the "capsule narrative" of the soldier he gave on Truth or Consequences that he developed This Is Your Life as a new radio show.  In the show, Edwards surprised each guest by narrating a biography of the subject. The show  "alternated in presenting the life stories of entertainment personalities and 'ordinary' people who had contributed in some way to their communities." The host, consulting his "red book", narrated while presenting the subject with family members, friends, and others who had affected his or her life.

By the 1950s, the show was aired live before a theater audience. The guests were surprised by Ralph Edwards and confronted by the microphone and cameras. Planning for the broadcast meant that some found out in advance that they were to be featured. For example, Eddie Cantor had a heart condition, so the show's producers made sure that he was not surprised.

Notable guests

One of the show's subjects was Rev. Kiyoshi Tanimoto, a survivor of the atomic bombing of Hiroshima.  During the episode Edwards introduced Tanimoto to Robert A. Lewis, the co-pilot of the Enola Gay, the plane that dropped the bomb on Hiroshima. Hanna Bloch Kohner, a Holocaust survivor, was a subject on May 27, 1953.

In February 1953, Lillian Roth, a "topflight torch singer of the Prohibition era" was the subject of the show, "cheerfully admit[ting] that she had been a hopeless drunk for 16 years before being rescued by Alcoholics Anonymous." Edwards described Roth's condition as "impending blindness, an inflamed sinus and a form of alcoholic insanity" and brought on a psychiatrist who had treated her, a brother-in-law "who had paid her bills" and several "glamorous foul-weather friends" such as Lita Grey Chaplin and Ruby Keeler.  Roth's story became the basis of her 1954 autobiography and 1955 film adaption, I'll Cry Tomorrow, with Edwards appearing as himself.

Kate Newcomb, a doctor who practiced in a "70-mile circle" around Woodruff, Wisconsin, was the subject of a 1954 episode, bringing attention to her "million pennies" drive to raise funds for a small community hospital; viewers of the episode donated over $112,000 in pennies.

The New York Times reported on September 1, 1955 that the Sixth United States Army requested a kinescope of the April 27 episode which honored World War II and Korean War General Mark Clark. The request stated, "We believe that showing of such a program would contribute materially toward the objectives of troop information, since it would create appreciation of the career of an outstanding military leader and further better understanding of certain highlights in the recent history of the Army."

According to The Complete Directory to Prime Time Network TV Shows, 1946–Present, one celebrity that was definitely forbidden was Edwards himself, who supposedly threatened to fire every member of his staff if they ever tried to turn the tables on him and publicly present Edwards' own life.

In a 1973 episode, Vincent Price was the surprised guest. The show had been planned with his wife Mary while Price was in the UK filming the movie Theatre of Blood. By the time he returned to his US home, he had split with his wife and begun a relationship with his co-star from the movie, Coral Browne. Price's daughter later revealed that his estranged wife had told him about the show in an attempt to manage any potential fall-out and unbeknownst to the producers, he agreed to act surprised when the show was recorded.

Reception

This Is Your Life was nominated three times for as "Best Audience Participation, Quiz or Panel Program" at the Emmy Awards, losing in 1953 at the 5th Emmy Awards to What's My Line? and sharing the category's award with What's My Line? at the Emmys in 1954 and 1955. It also fared well in the ratings during the 1950s, finishing at #11 in 1953–1954, #12 in 1954–1955, #26 in 1955–1956, #19 in 1957–1958 and #29 in 1958–1959.

By October 1960, Time magazine was calling This Is Your Life "the most sickeningly sentimental show on the air"; it cited a May 1960 episode on "Queens housewife and mother" Elizabeth Hahn as evidence that the show had "run through every faded actress still able to cry on cue" and had instead "turned to ordinary people as subjects for its weekly, treacly 'true-to-life' biographies."  The episode on Hahn was also cited as an example of the limited research that the show was doing on its guests.  The show had presented Hahn as "devoted to her husband and so dedicated to her children that she had worked as a chambermaid, waitress and cook to further their education and keep them off the streets", ignoring details such as that Hahn, on the advice of her rabbi, had brought her daughter into a magistrate's court as a delinquent, and that before the episode was broadcast, Hahn's husband had sued her for divorce.  Virginia Graham, in her autobiography, noted that the show had been characterized as a maudlin invasion of privacy.

Reruns and revivals
In the late 1980s, Edwards made many episodes that featured celebrities available for re-broadcasting:  American Movie Classics aired them for several years, accompanying them with "screenings of movies from studio-era Hollywood."

Edwards revived the series twice in syndication, the first in 1971 with Edwards again as host, and in 1983 with Joseph Campanella. Both failed to capture the magic of the original series, mostly due to the series being filmed or taped and, in the case of the 1971–72 version, some stations that aired it gave away the surprise elements in ads and promos for the show. During the late 1980s, Edwards hosted a few single prime time network airings of This Is Your Life, most memorably an episode featuring Betty White and Dick Van Dyke. Pat Sajak hosted an episode in November 1993 on NBC where Roy Scheider and Kathie Lee Gifford were the honorees, and Edwards made a cameo at the beginning, then appeared again when Kathie's work as a singer on the 70s version of Name that Tune, which Edwards produced, was mentioned. Actress Angie Dickinson was supposed to have been one of the two celebrities honoured in the special, and was lured under the pretext of being interviewed for a special about director Brian de Palma, but when host Sajak surprised her with the typical "this is your life!" greeting to kick off the show she refused to participate and walked out. She later said that she had previously been approached about being a guest on the show and had declined, and that the main reason she refused to participate was that she didn't look good crying.

In November 2005, ABC announced that it was developing a new version of the show, to be hosted by Regis Philbin. Coincidentally, creator, Ralph Edwards, died not long after the announcement was made. In August 2006, Philbin decided not to renew his contract with the show (he was committed to hosting America's Got Talent on NBC). ABC announced it was considering moving forward with another host in 2006, but this never came to fruition.

In October 2008, Survivor producer Mark Burnett signed a deal with Ralph Edwards Productions to produce an updated version. This also did not come to fruition.

International versions
International adaptations of the show:
 Australia – This Is Your Life (1975–1980, 1995–2005, 2008, 2011, 2022–)
 Chile –  (1965)
 Denmark –  (1983–1985, 1987, 1991, 1997–2000, 2011–2014)
 France –  ("This is your life!") (1993–1994, 2013–2015)
 Israel –  ("What a life") (1972–2012)
 Netherlands -  (1960–1961, 1985–1987,  1992/1993)
 New Zealand – This Is Your Life (1984–2000, 2007–2008, 2010–2011)
 Norway –  (1985–1986, 1995)
 Peru – Ésta es su vida (1961)
 Sweden –  ("Here is your life") (1980–1991,1995, 2009–2010, 2019), Ett sånt liv (1995)
 Spain –  (1962–1968, 1993)
 United Kingdom – This Is Your Life (1955–1964, 1969–2003, 2007)

In the Taiwanese variety show Super Sunday, the second half of each episode has a This Is Your Life-style segment where a celebrity or a local discussed their past followed by a cinematic re-enactment (usually exaggerated or serious) then a remote segment to search for the individual. However, the final result for each segment may or may not be successful.

Parodies

 The show was parodied in 1954 by Your Show of Shows, as "This Is Your Story". Carl Reiner played the host, who surprises an uncooperative audience member played by Sid Caesar.
 In 1955, Warner Bros. animator Friz Freleng did a sendup called "This Is a Life?", hosted by Elmer Fudd and featured Bugs Bunny as the guest of honor. The cartoon also featured  Daffy Duck, Granny and Yosemite Sam.
 Bob & Ray issued a 45 rpm record with a routine called "This Is Your Bed (You Made It, Now Lie in It)" on Coral (catalog number 9-61338) in 1955.
 A 1960 episode of Walt Disney Presents, "This Is Your Life, Donald Duck", was a parody tribute to Donald Duck, hosted by Jiminy Cricket.
 There was a recurring segment on the children's program Sesame Street, "Here is Your Life", which followed the show's format but featured inanimate objects — a loaf of bread, an oak tree, a tooth, a house, a shoe, and a carton of eggs — as its guests. Like most of the game show parodies on Sesame Street, the show was hosted by the Muppet character Guy Smiley; seven sketches were produced between 1972 and 1990. During Season 26 (1994-1995), two others were hosted by Sonny Friendly and the sketch was retitled as "The New Here is Your Life", featuring a storybook and a glass of milk as honorees. Another variant, "This Is Your Story" (1982), was a one-shot featuring Guy honoring Muppet Character Forgetful Jones.
 In 1976, the game show The Price Is Right parodied the show in one of its Showcase skits, called "This Is Your Strife," featuring bloopers involving model Janice Pennington. The cast had previously rehearsed a fake skit with Pennington, then sprung the "... Strife" skit on her as a surprise.
 As a part of a 1987 Howdy Doody 40th-anniversary retrospective special, Monty Hall and Buffalo Bob Smith imagined, as a way to celebrate Howdy Doody's birthday, a spoof of "This Is Your Life" called "Your Happiest Days".
 The WWE spoofed This Is Your Life three times with Mick Foley as the host. The purpose of these segments was to bring out individuals of the guest's past that embarrassed them. The most notable of these segments occurred on September 27, 1999, with The Rock, which many consider being the turning point in the Monday Night Wars. The first of these spoofs is still the highest-rated segment in WWE Monday Night RAW'''s history.
 In the early 1990s, McGruff the Crime Dog was honored by Ralph Edwards in a PSA from the Ad Council with National Crime Prevention Council.
 In Season 4 of The Good Place'', a parody takes place in the show's afterlife setting, called "That Was Your Life."

References

External links

 This Is Your Life, official website
 
 Encyclopedia of Television: This is Your Life from the Museum of Broadcast Communications
 This Is Your Life (U.S.) radio and TV episode list at ClassicTVInfo.com

1940s American radio programs
1950s American radio programs
1952 American television series debuts
1961 American television series endings
1970s American television series
1980s American television series
2000s American television series
1950s American documentary television series
1960s American documentary television series
American Broadcasting Company original programming
Black-and-white American television shows
CBS Radio programs
Emmy Award-winning programs
English-language television shows
American live television series
NBC original programming
NBC radio programs
Television series by Ralph Edwards Productions
20th-century history of the United States Army